Episcepsis is a genus of tiger moths in the family Erebidae. The genus was erected by Arthur Gardiner Butler in 1877.

Species

References

External links

"Episcepsis". Encyclopedia of Life.

Euchromiina
Moth genera